Pecora is a group of hoofed mammals that comprises most of the ruminants.

Pecora may also refer to:
 An occasional spelling of the Pechora River
 Pecora Escarpment, Antarctica
 Coda di Pecora, a grape variety

People
 Andrew Pecora (born 1957), American hematologist and oncologist
 Ferdinand Pecora (1882–1971), American lawyer, judge, and Chief Counsel to the United States Senate Committee on Banking and Currency 
 Pecora Commission
 Frank Pecora (1930-2017), Pennsylvania State Senator
 Santo Pecora (1902–1984), American jazz trombonist
 Tom Pecora (born 1961), American basketball coach
 William Thomas Pecora (1913–1972), American geologist.

See also
 Pechora (disambiguation)